The Martha Washingtonians (also known as the Ladies Washingtonian Society) were a group of working class women of the early 19th century committed to the idea of encouraging temperance. The organization was an outgrowth of the Washingtonian temperance movement.  As an organization, it was composed of wives, sisters, aunts, daughters and other female relatives of drunken men.

Despite the fact that for most women during this time, around the very beginnings of the United States, life was home-based, these women were actively going out into the streets and looking for the poor, impoverished souls and pointing them to a better way of life. During a time when a woman's place was in the kitchen, and creating a hearth to make the home a 'perfect' place, it might seem odd to see a group of women publicly tackling particular issues.

However, in light of context, these public acts and the roles that women were expected to take can appear somewhat less contradictory: Tyrell suggests that these women saw their public work as extensions of a 19th-century ideology that insisted on the ability of women to preserve the moral integrity of the private household. These readings seem to correspond to more general theories of an 'angel in the bedroom' theory of sexuality that has been attributed to the Victorians by late 20th century researchers of the period—the idea being that women had the capacity to cleanse the private household of the implications of 'amoral' capitalism.

Furthermore, historians such as Teresa Murphy insist on their relative subordination in the temperance movement. Murphy notes that many of these Martha Washingtonians were assigned rather traditional female roles: for example, collecting, making and selling clothing to the families of reformed drunks.

Women's rights were not prevalent nor wanted by most of these women- the movement was broadly conservative in outlook. They had no desire to vote, or to change America in any way besides alcohol consumption.

Considering that these were a group of women with little to no real political or financial power, the temperance movement was a resounding success, since America's consumption of alcohol was reduced by half in a period of around twenty years or so- the effects of these women were not insignificant.

See also 
 Temperance movement
 Prohibition

References

 "We Are Engaged as a Band of Sisters": Class and Domesticity in the Washingtonian Temperance Movement, 1840-1850 Ruth M. Alexander  Journal of American History, Vol. 75, No. 3 (Dec., 1988), pp. 763–785 
 http://silkworth.net/washingtonians/washingtonian_movement_spread_movement.html The Washingtonian Movement : The Spread of The Movement

Addiction and substance abuse organizations
Temperance organizations in the United States
Women's organizations based in the United States
1800s establishments in the United States